"Truce" is a song written and performed by Jars of Clay. It is the fifth and final radio single from the band's second studio album, Much Afraid. In addition, it was the fifth straight single from Much Afraid to reach number one on the Christian radio airplay charts. No promotional single was shipped to radio stations for airplay. Instead, radio stations played the track directly from the album.

Track listing
"Truce" - 3:11 (Charlie Lowell, Dan Haseltine, Matt Odmark, & Stephen Mason)

Performance Credits
Dan Haseltine - vocals, percussion
Charlie Lowell - keyboards, piano, organ, background vocals
Stephen Mason - guitars, bass, background vocals
Matt Odmark - guitars, background vocals
Greg Wells - drums

Technical Credits
Stephen Lipson - producer
Robert Beeson - executive producer
Heff Moraes - engineering, mixing
Chuck Linder - recording
Mike Griffith - engineering
Adam Hatley - engineering assistant
Stephen Marcussen - mastering
Don C. Tyler - digital editing

1998 singles
Jars of Clay songs
Song recordings produced by Stephen Lipson
Songs written by Dan Haseltine
Songs written by Charlie Lowell
Songs written by Stephen Mason (musician)
Songs written by Matt Odmark
1997 songs
Essential Records (Christian) singles